The 2017 Ford EcoBoost 400 was a Monster Energy NASCAR Cup Series race that was held on November 19, 2017, at Homestead-Miami Speedway in Homestead, Florida. Contested over 267 laps on the 1.5 mile (2.4 km) oval, it was the 36th and final race of the 2017 Monster Energy NASCAR Cup Series season, and was also the final race for the Chevrolet SS which debuted at the 2013 Daytona 500, as its replacement for 2018 would be the Camaro ZL1.

This race marks the final cup start for Dale Earnhardt Jr.

Report

Background

Homestead-Miami Speedway is a motor racing track located in Homestead, Florida. The track, which has several configurations, has promoted several series of racing, including NASCAR, the Verizon IndyCar Series, the Grand-Am Rolex Sports Car Series and the Championship Cup Series.

Since 2002, Homestead-Miami Speedway has hosted the final race of the season in all three of NASCAR's series: the Sprint Cup Series, Xfinity Series and Camping World Truck Series. Ford Motor Company sponsors all three of the season-ending races; the races have the names Ford EcoBoost 400, Ford EcoBoost 300 and Ford EcoBoost 200, respectively, and the weekend is marketed as Ford Championship Weekend. The Xfinity Series (then known as the Busch Series) has held its season-ending races at Homestead since 1995.

Championship drivers
Kyle Busch was the first of the four drivers to clinch a spot in the Championship 4, winning the first race of the Round of 8 at Martinsville.

Kevin Harvick clinched the second spot in the Championship 4, winning the second race of the Round of 8 at Texas.

Martin Truex Jr. clinched the third spot in the Championship 4 after the Texas race based on points.

Brad Keselowski clinched the final spot based on points after the Phoenix race.

Entry list

First practice

Qualifying

Qualifying results

Practice (post-qualifying)

Second practice

Final practice

Race

Race results

Stage results
Note: Martin Truex Jr., Kyle Busch, Kevin Harvick, and Brad Keselowski were not eligible for stage points because of their participation in the Championship 4.

Stage 1
Laps: 80

Stage 2
Laps: 80

Final stage results

Stage 3
Laps: 107

With the win at Miami, Truex is the 2017 Monster Energy NASCAR Cup Series Champion. While Busch finished 2nd in the championship. Harvick finished 3rd in the championship, and Keselowski finished 4th of the Championship 4.

Race statistics
 Lead changes: 4 among different drivers
 Cautions/Laps: 5 for 26
 Red flags: 0
 Time of race: 3 hours, 2 minutes, 11 seconds
 Average speed:

Media

Television
NBC covered the race on the television side. Rick Allen, Jeff Burton and Steve Letarte had the call in the booth for the race. Dave Burns, Parker Kligerman, Marty Snider and Kelli Stavast reported from pit lane during the race. While the race itself aired on NBC, NBCSN aired NBCSN NASCAR Hot Pass, a simultaneous live feed dedicated to each of the Championship drivers, with commentary by Leigh Diffey and Dale Jarrett. Also, three different angles from in-car cameras and a track map tracked the driver's position and changes throughout the field.

Radio
MRN had the radio call for the race, which was simulcast on Sirius XM NASCAR Radio.

Final season standings

Drivers' Championship standings

Manufacturers' Championship standings

Note: Only the first 16 positions are included for the driver standings.

References

Ford EcoBoost 400
Ford EcoBoost 400
NASCAR races at Homestead-Miami Speedway
Ford EcoBoost 400